Robert Michael Seay (pronounced "See") (born June 20, 1978) is a former Major League Baseball relief pitcher He has previously played for the Tampa Bay Devil Rays from 2001 to 2004, the Colorado Rockies in 2005, and the Detroit Tigers from 2006 to 2009.

High school
Seay is a graduate of Sarasota High School in Sarasota, Florida, where he compiled a 30–4 record in three years (1994–1996) with a 0.79 earned run average (ERA) and 362 strikeouts in  innings pitched. He led Sarasota High School to the Florida State Championship and #16 national ranking in his senior year, going 10–2 with an 0.70 ERA and 122 strikeouts and 29 base on balls in 70 innings. Seay was named First-team High School All-American and a finalist for Louisville Slugger's High School Player of the Year Award. Seay was drafted 12th overall by the Chicago White Sox in 1996 but was granted free agency based on Major League Baseball's amateur draft rule 4-3.

Olympics
Seay was a member of the United States baseball team that won the gold medal at the 2000 Summer Olympics.

Major Leagues

Tampa Bay Rays
Seay was signed by the Tampa Bay Devil Rays and made his Major League debut in 2001. His first appearance was in Yankee Stadium, allowing 1 hit and no runs. For the 2001 season, Seay pitched in 12 games. After the season, Seay was designated for assignment.

He signed a minor league deal to stay in Tampa. He missed most of the 2002 season with a shoulder injury.

In 2003, Seay appeared in 12 games while in 2004, he appeared in 21 games. He was traded in the offseason to the Colorado Rockies for outfielder Reggie Taylor after being designated for assignment.

Colorado Rockies
Then, only after three games with the Rockies he was placed on the 15-day disabled list with a strained left pectoral muscle. After the injury, Seay managed to appear in 14 more games. His ERA finished at 8.49 with Colorado.

Detroit Tigers
Seay recorded his first Major League save for the Tigers on May 20, 2007 against the St. Louis Cardinals.

In 2009, Seay tore his rotator cuff in his left shoulder, ending a solid season in which he compiled a 6–3 record and 4.25 ERA out of the Tigers bullpen. After spending all of 2010 trying to recover without surgery, Seay gave in and scheduled surgery.

References

External links

1978 births
Living people
Baseball players from Florida
Major League Baseball pitchers
Colorado Rockies players
Tampa Bay Devil Rays players
Detroit Tigers players
Baseball players at the 2000 Summer Olympics
Olympic gold medalists for the United States in baseball
Sarasota High School alumni
Sportspeople from Sarasota, Florida
Medalists at the 2000 Summer Olympics
Baseball players at the 1999 Pan American Games
Pan American Games silver medalists for the United States
Pan American Games medalists in baseball
Medalists at the 1999 Pan American Games
Charleston RiverDogs players
Colorado Springs Sky Sox players
Durham Bulls players
Orlando Rays players
St. Petersburg Devil Rays players
Toledo Mud Hens players
Tulsa Drillers players